Nasser Hemmasi was an Iranian chess player, three-times Iranian Chess Championship winner (1969, 1970, 1971).

Biography
In the begin of 1970s Nasser Hemmasi was one of the leading Iranian chess players. He three times in row won Iranian Chess Championship: 1969, 1970, and 1971. In 1969, in Singapore Nasser Hemmasi participated in FIDE World Chess Championship West Asian Zonal tournament and shared 6th-7th place.

Nasser Hemmasi played for Iran in the Chess Olympiad:
 In 1970, at first board in the 19th Chess Olympiad in Siegen (+4, =6, -7).

References

External links
 
 Nasser Hemmasi chess games at 365chess.com

Year of birth missing
Year of death missing
Iranian chess players
Chess Olympiad competitors
20th-century chess players